The Men's Decathlon at the 2000 Summer Olympics as part of the athletics program was held at the Stadium Australia on Wednesday 27 September and Thursday 28 September 2000.

After the first day of the contest, Chris Huffins found himself in en eight-point lead ahead of Dean Macey. Erki Nool and Tom Pappas occupied the next places. On the next day Nool dropped to fifth place after the 110 metres hurdles, but advanced again after the controversial discus contest. Starting off with two foul attempts, Nool was originally fouled in his third and last attempt as well, which would have resulted in him getting 0 points and falling out of the leading group. However, Nool successfully appealed the ring-foul ruling and had his throw measured to 43.66 metres, which saw him climb one place. The British delegation, representing Macey, protested to no avail.

Following Nool's strong result in the javelin throw event Huffins' lead had shrunk to only 14 points before the 1500 metres. As this was a weak event for Huffins he looked set to lose out in the medal chase; however, he managed to lower his personal best time by twelve seconds and grasped a bronze medal. Reigning world champion and world record holder Tomáš Dvořák struggled with a knee problem throughout the competition and finished in a disappointing sixth place.

Medalists

Šebrle would go on to break the world record in 2001 and win the gold medal at the 2004 Olympic Games in a new Olympic record. Huffins retired from international athletics after the end of the season.

Records
These were the standing world and Olympic records (in points) prior to the 2000 Summer Olympics.

Results

Overall results
Flying points table after 10th event:

See also
1998 Men's European Championships Decathlon
1999 Men's World Championships Decathlon
2000 Decathlon Year Ranking
2001 Men's World Championships Decathlon

Sources
 IAAF results day one: 100 m, long jump, shot put, high jump and 400 m. Retrieved 27 January 2007.
 IAAF results day two: 110 m hurdles, discus, pole vault, javelin and 1500 m. Retrieved 27 January 2007.
IAAF results: Final standings. Retrieved 27 January 2007.

References

External links
Report of the 2000 Sydney Summer Olympics

Decathlon
2000
Men's events at the 2000 Summer Olympics